Riseholme is a village in Lincolnshire, England.

Riseholme may also refer to:

Riseholme (fictional village), a fictional village in the "Mapp and Lucia" novels of E F Benson
Riseholme College, Riseholme, Lincolnshire, England

See also
Lobster à la Riseholme, a recipe served in two of the Mapp and Lucia novels